Assistant Surgeon Andrew Davidson (July 1, 1819 – June 30, 1901) was an American soldier who fought in the American Civil War. Davidson received the country's highest award for bravery during combat, the Medal of Honor, for his action during the Battle of Vicksburg in Mississippi on 3 May 1863. He was honored with the award on 17 October 1892.

Biography
Davidson was born in Middlebury, Vermont, on 1 July 1819. He enlisted into the 47th Ohio Infantry. He died on 30 June 1901 and his remains are interred at the Forest Rose Cemetery in Ohio.

Medal of Honor citation

See also
List of American Civil War Medal of Honor recipients: A–F

Notes

References

External links
 Ohio in the Civil War: 47th Ohio Volunteer Infantry by Larry Stevens
 National flag of the 47th Ohio Infantry (with streamers probably created after the war)
 National flag of the 47th Ohio Veteran Volunteer Infantry
 Regimental flag of the 47th Ohio Infantry
 Regimental flag of the 47th Ohio Infantry (probably second issue)
 Culture, West Virginia Medal of Honor Recipients
 A Forlorn Hope
 Vicksburg Medal of Honor Recipients
 Ohio Medal of Honor Recipients

1819 births
1901 deaths
People of Ohio in the American Civil War
Union Army officers
United States Army Medal of Honor recipients
American Civil War recipients of the Medal of Honor